Below are the mintage figures for the United States cent.

The following mint marks indicate which mint the coin was made at (parentheses indicate a lack of a mint mark):

P = Philadelphia Mint

D = Denver Mint

S = San Francisco Mint

W = West Point Mint

Flowing Hair large cent

Liberty Cap large cent

Draped Bust large cent

Classic Head large cent

Coronet Head large cent

Matron Head large cent

Braided Hair large cent

Flying Eagle cent

Indian Head cent

Cupronickel Indian cent

Bronze Indian cent

Lincoln cents

See also

Cent (United States coin)
 Wheat cent
 1943 steel cent
 1955 doubled die cent
 1974 aluminum cent
United States quarter mintage figures
Washington quarter mintage figures
50 State quarter mintage figures
America the Beautiful quarter mintage figures
 United States nickel mintage quantities
 Kennedy half dollar mintage figures

References

 Public domain text from the US Treasury Dept
 "A Guide Book of United States Coins," R.S. Yeoman, edited by Kenneth Bresset.  Whitman, annual edition.  The "Red Book" is the standard reference for U.S. coins.

External links

 US Lincoln Cent by year and type - histories, photos, and more
 Lincoln Cent Pictures

ja:リンカーン・セント
zh:林肯一分鋼幣